Jezuitský kostol may refer to:
 Jesuit Church, Bratislava
 Premonstratensian Church (Košice)